James Marks may refer to:
 James Marks (architect) (1834–1915), Australian architect
 James Marks (politician) (1835–1907), Member of the New South Wales Legislative Assembly